Falcatula tamsi is a moth of the family Sphingidae. It is known from Ethiopia.

The length of the forewings is 33 mm for males. The ground colour of the upperside of the forewings is pale greyish-yellow, but darker at the termen. There are two very small faint basal dots. The grey subbasal line is faint. The hindwings are indented at the margin and slightly produced at the tornus. The ground colour of the upperside is the same as the forewings, but the marginal area is darker. The underside ground colour is pale greyish yellow. The basal spots, subbasal and antemediallines and stigmata are absent in both wings. There are four wavy, parallel dark lines running from the costa to the inner margin beyond the end of the cell and there is a short dark streak from the subterminal line to the apex of the forewings. The proboscis is rudimentary. The antennae, head and body are uniformly pale greyish yellow.

References

Endemic fauna of Ethiopia
Smerinthini
Moths described in 1968
Insects of Ethiopia
Moths of Africa